Nevada's 1st congressional district occupies parts of communities in Clark County east of the Las Vegas Freeway and south of Nellis Air Force Base, including parts of Las Vegas, most of Henderson, Paradise, Sunrise Manor, and Winchester, as well as all of Boulder City, Nelson, and Whitney.

Before the 1980 census, Nevada was represented by a single at-large congressional district. As a result of the redistricting cycle after the 1980 Census, Nevada was split into two districts, due to its high population growth, relative to the rest of the country. From 1983 to 1993, the 1st district included most of Clark County. From 1993 to 2003, it covered most of the Las Vegas Valley, while the surrounding parts of Clark County (and the rest of the state) were in the 2nd district. Following the 2000 census, further population growth resulted in the creation of the 3rd congressional district, which included most of Henderson, North Las Vegas, Summerlin, and much of unincorporated Clark County. At the same time, the 1st district became smaller (and more population-dense), more urban, and more Democratic-leaning. It contracted even further after the 2010 census, which made it a majority-minority district; Hispanics now make up a plurality of its voters.

Voting
Election results from presidential and statewide races.
Results Under Current Lines (Since 2023)

Results Under Old Lines (2013-2023)

Results Under Old Lines (2003-2013)

Cities and townships 
 Las Vegas (Part)
 North Las Vegas (Part)
 Paradise (Part)
 Spring Valley (Part)
 Sunrise Manor (Part)
 Whitney (Part)
 Winchester

List of members representing the district

Election results

1982

1984

1986

1988

1990

1992

1994

1996

1998

2000

2002

2004

2006

2008

2010

2012

2014

2016

2018

2020

2022

Historical district boundaries

See also

Nevada's congressional districts
List of United States congressional districts

References

 Congressional Biographical Directory of the United States 1774–present

Congressional district, 01
01
Constituencies established in 1983
1983 establishments in Nevada